Pacific Hydro is a renewable energy company headquartered in Melbourne, Australia. The company was founded in 1992 and was soon floated on the Australian Stock Exchange, it was later bought by a consortium of industry superannuation funds and delisted. It is now owned by China's State Power Investment Corporation.

The company builds and operates renewable energy projects, initially hydro electricity on irrigation dams, before opening its first wind farm in 2010. Pacific Hydro develops hydro, wind, solar and geothermal power projects.  In addition to Australia, the company operates also in Brazil and Chile.

The company is also active in the carbon market in the production and trading of carbon credits from its run-of-river hydro projects registered under the Clean Development Mechanism of the Kyoto Protocol.

On 30 November 2006, Pacific Hydro acquired wind farms developer SES Soluções de Energias Sustentáveis and renamed it Pacific Hydro Brazil.

In 2012 Pacific Hydro Retail started operating in the Victorian market. It services the Commercial and Industrial, Small Business and Residential customer segments. Pacific Hydro retail was re-branded Tango Energy in 2016.

Power stations
Power stations owned and operated by Pacific Hydro include:

Wind
Codrington Wind Farm
Challicum Hills Wind Farm
Portland Wind Project

Water
Eildon Pondage Power Station
Lake Glenmaggie power station
Ord River Hydro Power Station
The Drop Hydro
William Hovell Power Station, a hydroelectric power station in the Hume region of Victoria, Australia

See also 
 :Category:Power stations in Australia
Wind power in Australia

References

External links 
 Pacific Hydro global website
 Pacific Hydro Australia website
 Pacific Hydro Brazil website
 Pacific Hydro Chile website

Electric power companies of Australia
Electric power companies of Brazil
Electric power companies of Chile
Australian companies established in 1992
Energy companies established in 1992